Sörvik is a locality situated in Ludvika Municipality, Dalarna County, Sweden with 743 inhabitants in 2010.
It is on the east shore of Lake Väsman.

Gallery

References 

Populated places in Dalarna County
Populated places in Ludvika Municipality